Josef Sterff (2 January 1935 – 7 September 2015) was a West German bobsledder who competed from the late 1950s to the early 1960s. He won a complete set of medals in the four-man event at the FIBT World Championships (gold: 1962, silver: 1958, bronze: 1959). Sterff also finished fifth in the four-man event at the 1964 Winter Olympics in Innsbruck.

References

Wallenchinsky, David. (1984). "Bobsled: Four-man". In The Complete Book of the Olympics: 1896-1980. New York: Penguin Books. p. 561.

Josef Sterff's obituary 

1935 births
2015 deaths
German male bobsledders
Bobsledders at the 1964 Winter Olympics
Olympic bobsledders of the United Team of Germany